Global University Systems B.V. (GUS) is a private limited company registered in the Netherlands. As a corporate group, it owns and operates several private for-profit colleges and universities in the UK, Canada, Israel and Europe, as well as other brands and companies in the education sector, such as the e-learning provider InterActive. GUS was founded in its present form and name in 2013 by Arkady Etingen, who serves as chairman, CEO and majority stockholder.

History
The London School of Business and Finance (LSBF), the forerunner of GUS, was founded in 2003 by Russian entrepreneur Arkady Etingen (sometimes known as Aaron Etingen). This was expanded to several UK for-profit educational institutions known collectively as the LSBF Group, all owned by Etingen and including the London College of Contemporary Arts (LCCA) and the LSBF School of English. After the market reforms of post-secondary education introduced by UK higher education minister David Willetts in 2011, the LSBF group rapidly expanded its student numbers. Etingen added St Patrick's College, London to his portfolio when his company Interactive World Wide Limited purchased the college in 2012.

Following a restructuring of his holdings in late 2012, Etingen established Global University Systems in 2013. Its UK business model at the time was heavily dependent on access to government-funded loans to cover students' tuition fees, with students recruited internationally. GUS was incorporated in the Netherlands as a Besloten vennootschap (or BV) and in turn became the owner of the LSBF Group institutions and St Patrick's College through Dutch holding companies. According to John Morgan writing in Times Higher Education, the Dutch "BV" structure (equivalent to a private limited liability company) does not require company accounts to be made publicly available and has a favourable tax regime compared to the UK. This led to further calls in 2017 for scrutiny of Dutch-incorporated private colleges and universities in the UK. GUS's expansion continued over the next three years with the acquisition of the German business school GISMA in 2013, University Canada West in 2014, and the UK's University of Law in 2015. All three were in financial difficulty at the time of their acquisition.

Concerns about the standards at both St Patrick's College and LSBF led to the UK government suspending their Tier 4 licences in 2015.  Following the  suspensions, Global University Systems announced plans for a two-year restructuring process of the group's UK holdings to begin in mid-2016. According to John Cox, former director of organisational development at GUS, the plan involved LSBF and its LCCA division coming under a new vocational entity offering only diploma courses, short courses and corporate training products. The vocational courses delivered by St Patrick's College and the Birmingham-based Finance Business Training would also come under this division. The University of Law was to become the sole provider of academic qualifications and professional qualifications, including the master's degrees previously offered by the LSBF Group. However, as of 2019 LSBF was still offering master's degrees awarded by the International Telematic University and Geneva Business School. There were no programmes provided or validated by the University of Law.

Between 2016 and 2018 GUS acquired further for-profit education institutions and companies, including the UK-based Arden University from Capella Education; IBAT College Dublin; the Israeli test-preparation company HighQ with INT college and merged the two; and Laureate Germany with its subsidiary institutions.

In July 2019, Global University Systems bought Pearl Academy and University of Petroleum and Energy Studies in India from Laureate International Universities in an INR 2,500 crore deal.

Global University Systems was awarded the title of 'Private Education Group of the Year' by Education Investor Awards 2019.

In 2020, GUS expanded its portfolio by acquiring Trebas Institute, a provider of music, film, business, technology, and management programmes with campuses in Toronto and Montreal, Canada.” 

In May 2020, Global University Systems acquired Canada-based post-secondary college Trebas Institute.

On 27 January 2021, it was reported that Global University Systems was seeking funding after announcing plans to sell its stake in various institutions, including the University of Law.

Marketing
As of 2018, GUS was recruiting students for its universities and colleges from more than 175 countries through a network of approximately 1,100 independent education agents and 500 staff in its own marketing, sales and business development departments. According to Moody's Investors Service, the company was deriving approximately 27% of its revenues in 2018 "from leveraging its agent network and marketing capabilities predominantly to source students for third-party institutions."

Principal subsidiaries
Canada
Toronto School of Management (career college, established 2017)
Trebas Institute (acquired 2020)
University Canada West (acquired 2014)
Canadian College of Technology and Business (career college, established 2021) 
The University of Niagara Falls Canada (Approved by Government of Ontario in 2022, will start recruiting students in 2024) 
Fleming College Toronto  

Germany
Berlin School of Business and Innovation (BSBI, offers degrees validated by International Telematic University, established 2018) 
GISMA Business School (acquired 2013)
HTK Academy of Design (acquired 2018)
University of Applied Sciences Europe (acquired 2018)

India
Pearl Academy (acquired 2019)
University of Petroleum and Energy Studies (acquired 2019)

Ireland
IBAT College Dublin (acquired 2016)

Israel
 HighQ (test preparation company preparing Israeli students for language, matriculation, and university entrance psychometric examinations, acquired 2017)
Institute of Technology and Innovation (also known as INT college, training college specialising in the high-tech industry, acquired 2018)

United Kingdom
Arden University (acquired 2016)
Futurelearn (acquired 2023)
InterActive Pro Ltd. (provider of online education services, established 2008)
London Academy of Trading (provider of financial trading education, majority shareholding acquired in 2014)
London College of Contemporary Arts (LCCA, established 2011)  
London College of Creative Media (LCCM, acquired 2018)
London School of Business and Finance (LSBF, established 2003)
St Patrick's College, London (acquired 2012) 
The Language Gallery (trading name of Accent Language Ltd., formerly the LSBF School of English, established 2008)
University of Law (acquired 2015)

References

External links

Education companies of Europe
Companies based in Amsterdam
Education companies established in 2013